The Denmark national rugby sevens team is a minor national sevens side.

Sri Lankan Rugby 7s
{| class="wikitable"
|-
!width=40|Year
!width=165|Cup
!width=165|Plate
!width=165|Bowl
|-
|1999||||||
|-
|2000|||||| 
|-
|2001||||||
|-
|2002||||||
|-
|2003||||||
|-
|2004||||||
|-
|2005||||||
|-
|2006||||||
|-
|2007||||||
|-
|2008||colspan=3 style="text-align: center;"|Did Not Compete
|}

Rugby union in Denmark
Denmark national rugby union team
National rugby sevens teams